Bitter Creek is a ghost town in Nolan County, Texas, United States.  Its location is not known, as the community no longer exists.

History
Bitter Creek was settled in the early 1880s by the Bardwell and Montgomery families. Bitter Creek is thought to have been located south of present Sweetwater, in northeast Nolan County. In 1923, oil was discovered in Bitter Creek. By the 1950s, its population declined to only five residents.

References

Geography of Nolan County, Texas
Ghost towns in West Texas